A by-election was held for the New South Wales Legislative Assembly electorate of Waratah on 5 December 1903 because of the resignation of Arthur Griffith to unsuccessfully contest a seat in the Senate at the 1903 federal election.

Dates

Result

				

Arthur Griffith resigned to unsuccessfully contest a seat in the Senate at the 1903 federal election.

See also
Electoral results for the district of Waratah
List of New South Wales state by-elections

Notes

References

1903 elections in Australia
New South Wales state by-elections
1900s in New South Wales